Anna Valle (born 19 June 1975) is an Italian actress and beauty pageant titleholder.

Life and career 
Born in Rome, Anna Valle lived in Ladispoli up to thirteen years; after the separation of her parents she moved to Sicily, in Lentini, the city of origin of the mother. After the high school, she enrolled at the Faculty of Law at the University of Catania, but she interrupted her studies in 1995, when she was elected Miss Italy. The following year she entered the competition at the Miss Universe 1996.

After having appeared in some fotoromanzi and a music video with Gianni Morandi Valle began to attend some acting schools in Rome and Milan, and debuted in the 1996 short film Le due bambole rosse. She later emerged as actress with the success of several television series such as Commesse and Cuore.

Filmography

Films

Television

References

External links 

1975 births
Actresses from Rome
Italian beauty pageant winners
Italian film actresses
Italian television actresses
Living people
Miss Universe 1996 contestants
University of Catania alumni